Reed Middle School can refer to several United States middle schools, including:
 Walter Reed Middle School in the Studio City area of Los Angeles, California
 Reed Middle School in Springfield, Missouri
 Reed Middle School in Hubbard, Ohio
 Reed Middle School in Duncanville, Texas